Razafimahatratra is a Malagasy surname. Notable people with this surname include:

 Jean de Dieu Razafimahatratra (born 1947), Malagasy judoka
 Josoa Razafimahatratra (born 1980), Malagasy football midfielder
 Victor Razafimahatratra, SJ (1921–1993), Malagasy Cardinal of the Roman Catholic Church
 Zarah Razafimahatratra (born 1994), Malagasy tennis player